Raumaster is a technology group supplying material handling systems for energy,  pulp and paper industries  based in Rauma, Finland. In 2020, the group's largest company, Raumaster Oy, had approximately 280 employees and a turnover of 122 million euros. Raumaster Group includes Raumaster Oy and its subsidiaries Raumaster AB in Sweden and Raumaster Paper Oy in Rauma. In 2019 Raumaster was among the 400 biggest companies in Finland by revenue.

History

1984–1989 
The founders of Raumaster got to know each other while working as engineers at Lönnström. Kauko Einälä, Jouko Mäkilä, Juhani Rasilainen, Jukka Ruohola and Esko Saarela founded their own company in April 1984. The main reason for their decision was a corporate acquisition where  Lönnström was sold to an outside party. The five men began to fear the direction into which the new management would be taking the business.  The founders formed the company's board of directors and Einälä was elected as a chairman. Rasilainen was appointed as the CEO, and a former plastic factory was leased as their first business premises. According to the founders, the name Raumaster means "Masters of Rauma".

At the time the company's operating idea was rare in Finland: the company designed the equipment, but manufacturing and installation was subcontracted. The company's first order was a screw reclaimer for Suomen Sokeri Oy’s factory in Salo in June 1984. A year later the first export was made to Gävle, Sweden.

In the end of 1980's Raumaster received its first orders from the Soviet Union and Asia through Ahlström.

1990–1999 
In 1992, the company had 30 employees.

A/S Rauameister, located in Vöru, Estonia, started its operations in January 1996. The company was owned by the Raumaster founders and three other people. Raumaster had 72 employees at the time.

Ketjurauma Oy was established in 1997. Like A/S Rauameister it was also owned by the owners of Raumaster who decided to transfer Raumaster's chain business to the new company.

2000–2009 

In 2003, Raumaster had 105 employees. About half of the company's net sales came from solid fuel and ash handling systems for power stations. The company also made paper roll handling and packaging systems, wood, wood chip and bark handling systems, and chemical and metallurgical handling systems. The roll handling business was transferred to the newly established subsidiary called Raumaster Paper Oy. It focused on paper industry products, mainly paper finishing automation, such as paper roll handling and packaging lines as well as core handling systems. Raumaster also had an own workshop in Rauma employing 20 people while the Estonian Rauameister had 60 employees. About half of Raumaster's production went directly to exports, in addition to which a quarter went abroad through its partners.
In 2005, the group's turnover was approximately 58 million euros. CEO Juhani Rasilainen turned 60 and wanted to partly retire and so he became the first President of the Raumaster Group. Marketing director Jouko Mäkilä, the youngest of the five founders, started as the new CEO in October.

In spring 2006, Raumaster started to manufacture pneumatic conveyors that are used for handling powdery substances like calcium oxide or gypsum. Raumaster Paper focused on roll handling systems that were able to do the packing, identifying and storing of paper rolls of different sizes. Purchased components and finished products were stored and dispatched from the central warehouse located in Rauma. When Raumaster had begun its operations, conveyors had been purely mechanical devices, but by the 21st century, electrical engineering had become a significant part of the delivery. Conveyors were expected to have more and more IT features that would allow for technical data, such as operational status, sequences and troubleshooting to be read and operated from the control room.

In 2007, Raumaster Paper expanded its operations to Pori.

A subsidiary, Raumaster AB, was established in Sweden in 2009.

2010–2019 
Raumaster started investing in the development of eucalyptus peeling and chipping technology in the 2010s.

In 2010, Raumaster Paper acquired the product rights from the Valkeakoski-based company Quattroll, which had gone bankrupt. Quattroll had manufactured slitters, reelers and other paper processing machines. As a result of the acquisition, a new office was established in Valkeakoski to which some of the former Quattroll employees were hired.

In 2011, Raumaster was one of the 500 largest companies in Finland based on its turnover. The company operated in Rauma, Pori and Valkeakoski and supplied heavy industry conveyor systems, such as belt conveyors, around the world.

In 2012, conveyor deliveries for the biopower plants in Finland were dominated by Raumaster and BMH Technology. Raumaster manufactured material handling systems for forest industry and energy production, including mechanical and pneumatic conveyor systems for solid fuels, ashes and various additives, conveyor systems for the recovery boiler area,  wood processing equipment for the pulp industry, and paper roll handling systems. Exports accounted for 75-80% of conveyor production. The group included Raumaster Oy, Raumaster Paper Oy and the Swedish Raumaster AB, with a total of 266 employees. Two-thirds of the staff were engineers. The company was headquartered in Rauma, where sales, project management and engineering were handled. Special equipment was also manufactured in Raumaster’s own workshop in Rauma. In addition, the group had offices in Pori, Sastamala, Valkeakoski, Shanghai, Tallinn and Västerås. The group and its affiliates Ketjurauma and the Estonian Rauameister workshop employed about 400 people in total.  The size of the company's individual orders varied between 50,000 euros and 20 million euros with an average of 4 million euros. 

In 2015 CEO Jouko Mäkilä turned 60 and was followed by John Bergman. 

Raumaster Oy faced a lawsuit when Pneuplan Oy claimed that Raumaster had wrongfully used its business secrets related to the manufacture of pneumatic conveyors between 2005 and 2017. In March 2017, the Pirkanmaa District Court dismissed the charges against Raumaster. In 2017, Raumaster employed almost 300 people, of which more than 200 in Rauma.

Pneuplan Oy took its charges to the Turku Court of Appeal, which in September 2018 confirmed the decisions of the district court: neither Raumaster Oy nor its management had committed to any criminal conduct, nor caused any damage to Pneuplan Oy. Raumaster had about 350 employees while its turnover was 153 million euros.

In spring 2019 Raumaster opened an office in Ylöjärvi.

2020–Current 
Kari Pasanen started as the company's CEO in February 2020.

In 2021, Raumaster had 400 employees. In May, Raumaster and thirteen other organisations in the Rauma region donated a professorship in automation technology to the University of Turku. In June, Stora Enso placed a major order to upgrade the wood chip handling systems at its Imatra mills.

Organization 

The Raumaster Group includes Raumaster Oy, Raumaster AB and Raumaster Paper Oy. Raumaster Oy’s CEO is Kari Pasanen.

Partners and cooperation 
Ketjurauma Oy in Rauma and the AS Rauameister workshop in Estonia are Raumaster's affiliates, as they have almost the same ownership as Raumaster. Raumaster has collaborated with several companies, for example Finnish Foster Wheeler and Kvaerner, Japanese Sumitomo Heavy Industries and German Voith Paper.

Products 
Raumaster manufactures conveyor systems and material handling systems for heavy industry. The systems are typically delivered to environments with an annual operating time of approximately 8,000 hours. In addition to conveyors, deliveries also include products related to the transport and storage of process substances such as ash and various solids. Chipper, bark drum, silo, unloader, screen, shredder and crusher are among the typical products. Raumaster's conveyors can handle, for example, wood chips, coal, bark, wood, as well as household, plastic, and industrial waste.

Markets 
In 2017, about 70 percent of Raumaster's net sales came from exports.

Raumaster's products are used, for example in pulp and paper mills, bio power plants and waste treatment plants.

Project examples: 

 chip and bark handling system for the Swedish Södra Cell's Värö plant
 bark and sawdust handling equipment for a pulp mill project in Indonesia
 fuel handling systems for Lahti Energy's Kymijärvi biopower plant 
 fuel handling system for waste energy plant in Shandong province south of Beijing
 by-product conveyors and a new type of screening concept for Metsä Fibre's Rauma sawmill conveyor systems for chips and bark handling, gasifier and soda boiler material handling and the main part of the conveyors for lime, caustic lime mud and causticizing to the Kemi pulp mill, as well as unloading and loading equipment for pulp bales to the port of Ajos

Recognitions 

 In 2003 Raumaster received the Finnish National Entrepreneur Award.
 In 2012 the Rauma Chamber of Commerce awarded the 2012 Internationalization Award to Raumaster.
 In 2014 Raumaster acquired the ISO 9001, ISO 14001 and OHSAS 18001 certificates covering quality, environment and occupational health and safety.

References

External links 

 Company's website
Manufacturing companies of Finland
Rauma, Finland
Material-handling equipment
Bulk material handling
Finnish companies established in 1984